David Alechenu Bonaventure Mark   is a retired Nigerian army brigadier general and politician. He was President of the Senate of Nigeria from 2007 to 2015 and was the Senator for Benue South Senatorial District Benue State. He is a member of the People's Democratic Party (PDP). Prior to his senatorial career, Mark was the military Governor of Niger State from 1984 to 1986 and the Minister of Communication.

Early life and education
Mark was born in Otukpo Benue State in April 1948. He attended St. Francis Catholic Practicing School before attending the Nigerian Military School. After that he attended the Nigerian Defence Academy. He was commissioned as a 2nd Lieutenant in 1970 and became a Captain in 1971. He was Commandant of Static Communications in 1974, then later held a political post as Chairman Abandoned Properties Implementation Committee in the Eastern region in 1976.

Minister
Mark headed the Communications Ministry and its two major parastatals: Nigerian Telecommunications Limited (NITEL) and Nigerian Postal Service (NIPOST). As Minister of Communications, Mark was sometimes known for his blunt talk; during a two-day walking tour of facilities in Akure in 1989, some union workers complained that some of its members had not been promoted since 1978. Mark's response was that those who have not been promoted may have to be retired, meaning that unproductive workers will have to be let go. He also espoused the opinion of death penalty for telecom cable thieves, as well as a policy of dismantling under-utilized telecom facilities citing political considerations for giving allocations to towns with limited use of phone networks.

Senate of Nigeria 
Mark was elected to his position as President of the Senate of Nigeria on June 6, 2007.

David Mark ran for re-election to the Senate for Benue South in April 2011 and was elected for a fourth term. David Mark noted that the polls pointed to his decisive victory, and called for his opponents to work together to improve Nigeria.

When leading the review of the Nigerian Constitution, Mark reportedly urged his colleagues to set aside their personal interests and focus on the interests of the Nigerian people. After the UK criticized Nigeria's Prohibition of Same-Sex Marriage bill, threatening to pull their foreign aid, Mark responded that they "should keep [their] aid." Mark called Nigeria's National Football Federation the "centre of corruption in the country," suggesting that they may need to temporarily disband to allow for reconstruction.

In September 2018 he was hoping to be a Presidential candidate and he appointed Zainab Abdulkadir Kure as his campaign manager and Abba Ejembi as his campaign's spokesperson.

Personal life
He enjoys golf, tennis, and squash. He is an Idoma Christian, He has 4-5 Wives.

Mark has a country house with a helicopter and helipad.

References

External links

Assemblyonline Nigeria News: Gender equality impossible in politics says David Mark. 
BBC News: Legal blow for Nigerian senator; A tribunal in Nigeria has annulled the election of the president of the senate, David Mark. 

Presidents of the Senate (Nigeria)
Nigerian generals
People from Benue State
Governors of Niger State
Living people
Nigerian Roman Catholics
Idoma people
Nigerian Christians
Peoples Democratic Party members of the Senate (Nigeria)
Nigerian Defence Academy alumni
20th-century Nigerian politicians
21st-century Nigerian politicians
Peoples Democratic Party (Nigeria) politicians
Year of birth missing (living people)